Creels is an unincorporated community in Wood County, West Virginia, United States.

Wood County is in the Eastern Time Zone (UTC -5 hours).

References 

Unincorporated communities in West Virginia
Unincorporated communities in Wood County, West Virginia